Dwight Lamont Grant (born September 14, 1984) is an American  mixed martial artist (MMA) who competes in the welterweight division. He had previously fought in the Ultimate Fighting Championship (UFC).

Background 
Born and raised in the Bedford-Stuyvesant neighborhood of Brooklyn to parents of Guyanese descent, Grant was a World Kickboxing Association middleweight champion before embarking on a career in MMA.

Mixed martial arts career

Early career 
After amassing an amateur record of 3–1, Grant started his professional MMA career in 2011 and fought primarily on the regional circuit of the northeastern United States. He amassed a record of 8–1 before signed by UFC.

Dana White's Tuesday Night Contention Series 
Grant faced Tyler Hill on June 19, 2018, at Dana White's Contender Series 10. He won the fight via knockout in round two and this win earned him the UFC contract.

Ultimate Fighting Championship 
Two month after the win over Hill, Grant made his promotional debut on 11 day notice, replacing, on June 19, 2018, against Erik Koch at UFC on Fox: Lee vs. Iaquinta 2. However, Koch was removed from the card on November 28 for undisclosed reasons and replaced by Zak Ottow. He lost the fight by split decision.

Grant was scheduled to face Chance Renountre, replacing Randy Brown, on January 19, 2019, at UFC Fight Night: Cejudo vs. Dillashaw. However, Grant was unable to be cleared to fight due to an "eye issue" and he pulled out from the fight.

Grant was originally scheduled to face Carlo Pedersoli Jr. on February 23, 2019, at UFC Fight Night: Błachowicz vs. Santos. He won the fight via technical knockout in round one.  This win earned him the Performance of the Night award.

Grant faced Alan Jouban on April 13, 2019, at UFC 236. He won the fight via split decision.

Grant was expected to face Jared Gooden on August 22, 2020, at UFC on ESPN 15. However, Gooden pulled out of the during the week leading up to the event with an undisclosed injury. Grant instead faced Daniel Rodriguez. After initially nearly finishing Rodriguez, Grant was knocked down multiple times and ultimately lost the fight via knockout in round one.

Grant was scheduled to face Li Jingliang on December 12, 2020, at UFC 256. However, on December 8, 2020, Grant tested positive for COVID-19 during fight week and had to pull out of his welterweight bout against Li.

Grant faced Stefan Sekulić on April 24, 2021, at UFC 261. He won the bout via split decision.

Grant was scheduled to face Gabriel Green on October 23, 2021, at UFC Fight Night 196. However, Green was removed from the pairing on 23 September for undisclosed reasons and replaced by Francisco Trinaldo. Grant lost the fight via split decision.

Grant faced Sergey Khandozhko on April 23, 2022, at UFC Fight Night 205. After both fighters were knocked down multiple times, Grant ultimately lost the fight via technical knockout in the second round. This fight earned him the Fight of the Night award.

Grant faced Dustin Stoltzfus on July 16, 2022 at UFC on ABC 3. He lost the fight via unanimous decision.

In July 2022, it was announced that Grant was no longer on the UFC roster.

Championships and accomplishments
 Ultimate Fighting Championship
 Performance of the Night (One time) 
 Fight of the Night (One time)

Mixed martial arts record 

|-
|Loss
|align=center|11–6
|Dustin Stoltzfus
|Decision (unanimous)
|UFC on ABC: Ortega vs. Rodríguez
|
|align=center|3
|align=center|5:00
|Elmont, New York, United States
|
|-
|Loss
|align=center|11–5
|Sergey Khandozhko
|TKO (punches)
|UFC Fight Night: Lemos vs. Andrade
|
|align=center|2
|align=center|4:15
|Las Vegas, Nevada, United States
||
|-
|Loss
|align=center|11–4
|Francisco Trinaldo
|Decision (split)
|UFC Fight Night: Costa vs. Vettori
|
|align=center|3
|align=center|5:00
|Las Vegas, Nevada, United States
|
|-
|Win
|align=center|11–3
|Stefan Sekulić
|Decision (split)
|UFC 261
|
|align=center|3
|align=center|5:00
|Jacksonville, Florida, United States
|
|-
|Loss
|align=center|10–3
|Daniel Rodriguez
|KO (punches)
|UFC on ESPN: Munhoz vs. Edgar
|
|align=center|1
|align=center|2:24
|Las Vegas, Nevada, United States
|
|-
|Win
|align=center|10–2
|Alan Jouban
|Decision (split)
|UFC 236
|
|align=center|3
|align=center|5:00
|Atlanta, Georgia, United States
|
|-
|Win
|align=center|9–2
|Carlo Pedersoli Jr.
|TKO (punches)
|UFC Fight Night: Błachowicz vs. Santos
|
|align=center|1
|align=center|4:59
|Prague, Czech Republic
|
|-
|Loss
|align=center|8–2
|Zak Ottow
|Decision (split)
|UFC on Fox: Lee vs. Iaquinta 2
|
|align=center|3
|align=center|5:00
|Milwaukee, Wisconsin, United States
|
|-
|Win
|align=center|8–1
|Tyler Hill
|KO (punches)
|Dana White's Contender Series 10
|
|align=center|2
|align=center|2:08
|Las Vegas, Nevada, United States
|
|-
|Win
|align=center|7–1
|Danasabe Mohammed
|Decision (unanimous)
|Bellator 165
|
|align=center|3
|align=center|5:00
|San Jose, California, United States
|
|-
|Win
|align=center|6–1
|Jordan Williams
|KO (punch)
|Conquer FC 2
|
|align=center|1
|align=center|2:47
|Richmond, California, United States
|
|-
|Win
|align=center|5–1
|Adam Corrigan
|Decision (unanimous)
|Global Knockout 4
|
|align=center|3
|align=center|5:00
|Jackson, California, United States
|
|-
|Win
|align=center|4–1
|Sergio Vasquez
|TKO (punches)
|Global Knockout 2
|
|align=center|3
|align=center|5:00
|Jackson, California, United States
|
|-
|Win
|align=center|3–1
|Eddie Saldana
|TKO (knees)
|Reality Fighting: Mohegan Sun
|
|align=center|3
|align=center|1:22
|Uncasville, Connecticut, United States
|
|-
|Win
|align=center|2–1
|Erik Purcell
|TKO (punches)
|Reality Fighting: Gonzaga vs. Porter
|
|align=center|1
|align=center|0:14
|Uncasville, Connecticut, United States
|
|-
|Loss
|align=center|1–1
|Chase Owens
|Decision (unanimous)
|PA Cage Fight 8
|
|align=center|3
|align=center|5:00
|Scranton, Pennsylvania, United States
|
|-
|Win
|align=center|1–0
|Jason Ward
|KO (punch)
|Reality Fighting: Mohegan Sun
|
|align=center|1
|align=center|3:29
|Uncasville, Connecticut, United States
|
|-

See also 
 List of male mixed martial artists

References

External links 
 
 

Living people
1984 births
Welterweight mixed martial artists
American male mixed martial artists
American practitioners of Brazilian jiu-jitsu
American wushu practitioners
Mixed martial artists from New York (state)
Mixed martial artists utilizing wushu
Mixed martial artists utilizing Brazilian jiu-jitsu
Ultimate Fighting Championship male fighters
American people of Guyanese descent